Thomas Hanbury (1572–1617) was MP for Petersfield from  1597 to 1601.

Hanbury was the son of Thomas Hanbury of Buriton, Auditor of the Exchequer and his wife Blanche née Bowyer. He was educated at Hart Hall, Oxford. He bought the Letters Patent for Petersfield in 1599.

References

Bibliography
'Petersfield Through Time', Jeffrey, D. : Stroud, Gloucestershire; Amberley Publishing; 2013 
'Report of the case of the borough of Petersfield in the County of Southampton, tried and determined by two select committees of the House of Commons in 1820/21': London; Thomas Davison; 1821

People from Petersfield
16th-century English people
17th-century English people
English MPs 1597–1598
1572 births
1617 deaths
Alumni of Hart Hall, Oxford
People from Buriton